Habits Old and New is the thirty-first studio album by Hank Williams Jr. and was released under Elektra Records/Curb Records in June 1980. Habits Old and New was Williams' third full-length album in a fourteen-month span, following Family Tradition and Whiskey Bent and Hell Bound that were released in April and November 1979. It was also his fifth album on the Elektra/Curb label.

Reception
The album was not as critically acclaimed or commercially successful as Family Tradition and Whiskey Bent and Hell Bound. It peaked at number 4 on the Billboard Top Country Albums chart and produced two Top 20 singles. The first single released was a modern and up tempo version of "Kaw-Liga", a song written by Hank Williams, Sr. and Fred Rose. It was released as a single after Hank, Sr.'s death in January 1953 and spent fourteen weeks at number 1 on the Billboard country singles chart. Hank, Jr.'s version wasn't as successful, eventually peaking at number 12 on the Billboard Hot Country Singles & Tracks chart. The follow up single was an original song of Hank, Jr. titled "Old Habits" that fared better, peaking at number 6 on the Hot Country Singles & Tracks chart. Habits Old and New would eventually be certified Gold by the RIAA, making it his fourth career Gold album and his third consecutive Gold while signed with Curb.

Track listing
All tracks composed by Hank Williams Jr.; except where indicated
"Old Habits" – 3:02
"Dinosaur" (Hank Williams Jr., Bob Corbin) – 3:17
"Kaw-Liga" (Hank Williams, Fred Rose) – 4:21
"Here I Am Fallin' Again" – 3:37
"The Blues Man" – 4:18
"All In Alabama" – 4:01
"The American Way" – 3:04
"Move It On Over" (Hank Williams) – 3:05
"Won't It Be Nice" (Hank Williams Jr., Merle Kilgore) – 3:08
"If You Don't Like Hank Williams" (Kris Kristofferson) – 2:51

Personnel
Hank Williams, Jr. - vocals, acoustic and electric guitar, keyboards
Leo Jackson, Rock Killough, Randy Scruggs - acoustic guitar
Rock Killough, Sonny Throckmorton, Dennis Wilson - backing vocals
Bobby Thompson - banjo
Joe Osborn - bass
Jerry Carrigan, Larrie Londin - drums
Dan Eckley, Reggie Young - electric guitar
Lisa Silver, Rufus Thibodeaux - fiddle
Muscle Shoals Horns - horns
Bobby Emmons, Larry Knechtel, Shane Keister - keyboards
Kieran Kane - mandolin
Dicky Overbey - steel guitar, percussion

Chart performance

References

Hank Williams Jr. albums
1980 albums
Albums produced by Jimmy Bowen
Warner Records albums